Results from the 2006 Buenos Aires Grand Prix held at Buenos Aires on October 29, 2006, in the Autódromo Oscar Alfredo Gálvez.The race was the second race for the 2006 Buenos Aires Grand Prix of Formula Three Sudamericana.

Classification 

Buenos Aires Grand Prix
Buenos Aires Grand Prix Race2
2006 in Argentine motorsport
October 2006 sports events in South America